Buennagel Peak is a rock peak  east of Alexander Peak in the north part of the Haines Mountains, in the Ford Ranges of Marie Byrd Land. It was mapped by the United States Antarctic Service (1939–41) and by the United States Geological Survey from surveys and U.S. Navy air photos (1959–65), and named by the Advisory Committee on Antarctic Names for Lawrence A. Buennagel, a geomagnetist/seismologist at Byrd Station, 1968.

References 

Mountains of Marie Byrd Land